Shannon May (born 9 June 1991) is an Australian soccer player who plays for Australian W-League team Perth Glory.

May was part of the Glory's inaugural W-League squad, scoring the team's first goal in their second match of the 2008–09 W-League season against Central Coast Mariners.

In December 2009, she was awarded the team's Most Glorious Player award - an award presented to the team's best player each season.

May became the first Perth Glory player to reach the 100-game mark in the W-League in 2018.

May also plays for local side Beckenham Angels SC in the Bank West Women's state League.

In November 2020, May departed Perth Glory.

References

1991 births
Living people
Australian women's soccer players
Soccer players from Perth, Western Australia
Perth Glory FC (A-League Women) players
A-League Women players
Women's association football midfielders